William of Exeter may refer to:
William of Exeter (fl. 1320–40) English author
William of Exeter (died 1365), English writer
William of Exeter (physician), physician to Queen Philippa, Queen consort of King Edward III of England